Kamagut is a Sub-Location in Turbo Division of the Uasin Gishu County. William Ruto, who is currently the President of Kenya as of 13 September 2022, is unarguably Kamagut's most famous resident. It is 15 km from the town of Eldoret.

References 

Populated places in Rift Valley Province